Princess Maria Carolina Christina of Bourbon-Parma, Marchioness of Sala (born 23 June 1974), is the fourth and youngest child of Princess Irene of the Netherlands and Carlos Hugo, Duke of Parma. She is a member of the House of Bourbon-Parma as well an extended member of the Dutch royal family. Per a 1996 royal decree issued by Queen Beatrix, she is entitled to the style and title Her Royal Highness Princess Maria Carolina de Bourbon de Parme in The Netherlands as a member of the extended royal family.

Early life

Princess Carolina was born at 23 June 1974 in Nijmegen. She has two older brothers, Prince Carlos, the head of the House of Bourbon-Parma, and Prince Jaime. She also has one older sister, Princess Margarita. She was baptised at the Castle of Lignières in France with Prince Claus of the Netherlands, Princess Christina of the Netherlands and Princess Marie des Neiges of Bourbon-Parma as her godparents.

In 1981, when she was six, her parents decided to divorce. She moved together with her mother and her brothers and sister to Soest, Netherlands, nearby the then residence of her grandparents the former Queen of the Netherlands Queen Juliana of the Netherlands and Prince Bernhard of Lippe-Biesterfeld. Later on they lived for a while in a villa at Wijk bij Duurstede.

Education and career
Princess Carolina studied political science at University of Amsterdam and Harvard University, and also has an M.Sc. in Forced Migration from the University of Oxford. She has had a career at the United Nations. For this organisation she was stationed at the UN headquarters in New York City, as well as problematic areas such as Eritrea, the Gaza Strip, and in Acheh (Indonesia) after the 2004 Indian Ocean tsunami. She is currently employed at the United Nations in Geneva, in the Organisation for the Coordination of Humanitarian Affairs (OCHA).

Marriage
On 9 January 2012, it was announced Carolina would marry Albert Alphons Ludgerus Brenninkmeijer, (born 16 May 1974), a member of the wealthy Brenninkmeijer family. The civil marriage took place on 21 April 2012 at Wijk bij Duurstede. The church wedding took place at the San Miniato al Monte on 16 June 2012 in Florence, Italy. The couple have two children, a daughter and a son:
 Alaïa-Maria Irene Cécile Brenninkmeijer, born 20 May 2014 in Zurich, Switzerland. She had a double christening with her cousin Princess Zita Clara of Bourbon-Parma on 4 October 2014 at Noordwijk aan Zee in the Netherlands. Her godparents are Princess Margarita of Bourbon-Parma, Prince Constantijn of the Netherlands, Philippe Brenninkmeijer and Silvia Brenninkmeijer-Arboli.
 Xavier Albert Alphons Brenninkmeijer, born 16 December 2015 in Zurich, Switzerland.

Other activities

The princess has been seen regularly at important events of the royal house of the Netherlands. In 2001 she was one of the maids of honor at the wedding of Prince Constantijn and Petra Laurentien Brinkhorst; and during the baptism of their daughter, Countess Eloise of Orange-Nassau, she was the godmother of the child. She was a witness at the church wedding of her cousin Prince Floris of Orange-Nassau, van Vollenhoven, and in 2010, was named as the godmother of Floris' second child, Eliane.

Titles, styles and honours
Already a ducal princess from birth, her father bestowed the substantive title Marchesa di Sala (Marchioness of Sala) upon her on 2 September 1996. In 1996 she was incorporated into the Dutch nobility by her aunt Queen Beatrix, with the highest title of nobility Prinses de Bourbon de Parme (Princess of Bourbon-Parma) and styled Hare Koninklijke Hoogheid (Her Royal Highness). She does not belong to the House of Orange-Nassau or the limited Dutch royal house, but as a granddaughter of Queen Juliana and first cousin of the present King Willem-Alexander, she is officially a member of the more extended Dutch royal family.

Honours
  Ducal Family of Parma: Knight of the Parmese Sacred Military Constantinian Order of Saint George
  Ducal Family of Parma: Knight Grand Cross of the Order of Saint Louis for Civil Merit
 : Recipient of the King Willem-Alexander Investiture Medal

Ancestry

References

External links

Official website of the House of Bourbon-Parma
Second official website of the House of Bourbon-Parma
Biography of Her Royal Highness Princess Maria Carolina

1974 births
People from Nijmegen
Harvard University alumni
Princesses of Bourbon-Parma
Dutch princesses
Italian nobility
20th-century Spanish nobility
Living people
Alumni of the University of Oxford
University of Amsterdam alumni